Thoroughbred is a 1936 Australian race-horse drama film directed by Ken G. Hall, partly based on the life and career of Phar Lap. Hollywood star Helen Twelvetrees was imported to Australia to appear in the film. The film also stars Frank Leighton and John Longden.

Plot summary
A Canadian horse trainer, Joan, is the adopted daughter of horse trainer and breeder Ma Dawson. She buys an unwanted thoroughbred colt named Stormalong. Joan nurses the horse back to health with the help of Ma's son Tommy, and Stormalong starts to win races. He becomes the favourite to win the Melbourne Cup which attracts the interest of a gambling syndicate who try to dope the horse and kill it in a stable fire. They then kidnap Tommy prior to the race.

Stormalong manages to participate in the Cup, and although is mortally wounded by a sniper, lives long enough to come first place. Tommy escapes and helps the police capture the gangsters.

Cast
Helen Twelvetrees as Joan
Frank Leighton as Tommy Dawson
John Longden as Bill Peel
Nellie Barnes as Judy Cross
Elaine Hamill
Ronald Whelan
Les Warton
Harold Meade
Edmond Seward as Mr Terry

Production
The film was the first made by Cinesound after the studio ceased production in 1935 enabling Hall to visit Hollywood for a number of months. While in Hollywood there he signed contracts with American star Helen Twelvetrees and writer Edmond Seward to work on the film. (Sally Blane and Norman Foster had been originally considered).

He also purchased a rear-projection unit which was used extensively in the film. The budget was originally announced as £25,000.

Twelvetrees was paid £1,000 a week, reportedly the highest salary ever paid by the Australian film industry to an actor. (Another source said £200 a week.)

Her co-stars would be Australian leading man Frank Leighton and English actor John Longden who was having an extended stay in Australia. According to Ken G. Hall, Twelvetrees and Leighton had an affair during filming, despite the actress having been accompanied to Australia by her husband and baby. Her husband found out and threatened to kill Leighton. Hall told Stuart F. Doyle who arranged for some detective friends to force Twelvetrees' husband to leave Australia.

This was the first movie with Cinesound for actor Ron Whelan, who joined the company as assistant director and also worked as an actor in several films.

Australia's Prime Minister Joseph Lyons visited the set during filming.

The horses races were shot in part by a camera man being towed on a sled.

The climax is similar to the 1934 Frank Capra film, Broadway Bill. Hall claimed he was unaware of this and blamed it on Seward.

Release
The film was popular although reviews were mixed, with some criticism of the script.

The film received a release in the UK, but was subject to cuts from the censor on the grounds of scenes depicting cruelty to animals, in particular the stable fire. The movie was not a success at the English box office.

A novelised version of the screenplay sold out within three days, at a rate of 1,000 copies a day.

References

Notes
Hall, Ken G. Directed by Ken G. Hall: Autobiography of an Australian Filmmaker, Lansdowne Press, 1977

External links

Thoroughbred in the Internet Movie Database
Thoroughbred at Australian Screen Online
Thoroughbred at Oz Movies
Correspondence relating to copyright of script at National Archives of Australia (including copy of shooting script)
Review of film at Variety

1936 films
Films directed by Ken G. Hall
Australian sports drama films
Australian black-and-white films
1930s sports drama films
1936 drama films
1930s Australian films
1930s English-language films
Cinesound Productions films